The Reform Party of the United States of America (RPUSA) was founded in 1995 by Ross Perot. Because the party had just recently been formed, the traditional system of presidential primaries in use by the Republican and Democratic parties was not considered practical for the Reform Party to use for its presidential primary in 1996. Instead, a national primary was held through the mail in which Reform Party supporters voted for a number of candidates, while ballot efforts were concentrated entirely towards the general election.

Candidates

The mail-in primary 
In 1995, former presidential candidate Ross Perot's lobbying group United We Stand America decided to become a political party. Thus, the Reform Party of the United States of America was created.

During the 1996 presidential primaries, the Reform Party was seeking an alternative candidate to party founder Ross Perot, who stated he didn't plan on running for president again. Reform Party activist Mark Sturdevant urged Colorado Governor Richard Lamm to seek the party's nomination. Initially hesitant, Lamm decided that if Ross Perot didn't run then he would enter the presidential race.

Lamm was assured Perot had no intention of running, and he entered the Reform Party's primaries on June 9, with Ed Zschau as his running mate.

Lamm remained a registered member of the Democratic Party, stating: "you can't become a member of the Reform Party in Colorado. There is no Reform Party in Colorado.... I can participate by staying a Democrat. I couldn't become a member of the Reform Party if I wanted to, but I am encouraging people to sign petitions so that they can get on the ballot here in Colorado. We've got to be on the ballot in all 50 states."

On March 19, Perot hinted that he may enter the Reform Party presidential primaries. Later that summer, Perot announced his presidential candidacy. Most Reform Party members supported Perot, and he was the overwhelming victor during the primaries.

Lamm addressed the Reform Party's 1996 National Convention, held in Long Beach, California. In his speech, he criticized President Bill Clinton, saying: "no nation has ever borrowed its way to greatness!" He also blasted Political Action Committees for running dishonest commercials, and stated he hoped the Reform Party would become a "truth telling, straight talking political party... run by ordinary citizens."

His speech received a standing ovation, and he congratulated Ross Perot on his primary victory.

Results by state

References 

Reform Party of the United States of America presidential primaries
1996 United States presidential primaries